Marcus Fabius Vibulanus was consul of the Roman republic in 442 BC and consular tribune in 433 BC.

Marcus belonged to the influential Fabia gens and was the son of one of the early republics leading men, Quintus Fabius Vibulanus, consul in 467, 465 and 459 BC. He was probably the elder brother of Quintus Fabius Vibulanus, consul in 423 BC, and Gnaeus Fabius Vibulanus, consul in 421 BC. Filiations indicate that he, or an otherwise unattested Marcus Fabius Ambustus, pontifex maximus in 390 BC, is the father of the three brothers and consular tribunes Caeso Fabius Ambustus, Numerius Fabius Ambustus and Quintus Fabius Ambustus.

Career 
Marcus was elected consul in 442 BC together with Postumus Aebutius Hela Cornicen. Their year of office was peaceful and they enacted measures to send commissioners to establish a colony at Ardea. Many Romans wanted the colony to receive the majority of the land distributed, but it was decided to allot it first to the Rutuli, who were native to Ardea, and give the Roman colonists the remaining land.

In 437 BC Rome was involved with wars against the Veii, Falerii and the Fidenae, A dictator, Mamercus Aemilius Mamercinus, was appointed to handle the crisis. Marcus was one of the legates under the dictator and lead armies against the Veii.

He would be elected to hold imperium once more, in 433 BC as consular tribune, together with Marcus Folius Flaccinator and Lucius Sergius Fidenas.

Two years later, in 431 BC, he would again be appointed legate, serving under the dictator Aulus Postumius Tubertus against the Aequi and Volsci.

References 

5th-century BC Roman consuls
Vibulanus, Marcus